The Church of St Teilo is the parish church of Llantilio Pertholey, Monmouthshire, Wales.  "An unusually large and varied church", it is a Grade I listed building as of 1 September 1956

History and architecture

The church is thirteenth century in origin with significant additions in the sixteenth century, a major restoration in 1890 and further minor restoration in the twentieth century.  The tower is of the early fourteenth century and the aisle of slightly later date. Around the chancel are three chantry chapels, the church's "most memorable" features. The bell tower holds six bells, dating from the seventeenth century.

Services are held at the church on Wednesdays, Fridays and Sundays.

Notes

References
 

Grade I listed churches in Monmouthshire
Church in Wales church buildings
13th-century church buildings in Wales